The Naples Half Marathon is an annual half marathon road running race held in Naples, Florida, United States, since 1989 (with the exception of 2016 due to a tornado).  The 25th running of the race was held on January 20, 2013, with 2036 runners taking part, including two-time Olympian Anthony Famiglietti, who finished seventh. The 2014 race saw a repeat victory by Kiprono Kurgat ahead of a crowd of 2412 total runners.

The race has been called one of the best 27 half marathons in the United States by Runner's World magazine.

The men's record on the course is held by Cleophas Ngetich, with a time of 1:02:41, while the women's record is 1:09:57, held by Gebre Belainesh.

The course starts down 5th Avenue South, then turns south down Gordon Drive for just under 3 miles, then turns around to go north up Gordon Drive for over another mile. Then, the course turns into the Port Royal neighborhood at Kings Town Drive, with a loop down Fort Charles Drive (where the halfway mark is, on the northbound return leg), up Treasure Lane to Galleon Drive, then back out via Treasure Lane to Kings Town, and back north on Gordon. There is a turn onto 8th Avenue South, then the finish is up 8th Street next to Cambier Park.

Winners

References

Half marathons in the United States
Sports competitions in Florida
Track and field in Florida
Sports in Naples, Florida
January sporting events
Recurring sporting events established in 1989
1989 establishments in Florida